Kunti Singh is an Indian politician and member of the Bharatiya Janata Party. Singh was a member of the Jharkhand Legislative Assembly from the Jharia constituency in Dhanbad district. She is President of Janata Mazdoor Sangh.

References 

People from Dhanbad district
Bharatiya Janata Party politicians from Jharkhand
Members of the Jharkhand Legislative Assembly
Living people
21st-century Indian politicians
Year of birth missing (living people)